This is a list of 1998 British incumbents.

Government
 Monarch
 Head of State - Elizabeth II, Queen of the United Kingdom (1952–2022)
 Prime Minister
 Head of Government - Tony Blair, Prime Minister of the United Kingdom (1997–2007)
Deputy Prime Minister
 Deputy Head of Government - John Prescott, Deputy Prime Minister of the United Kingdom (1997–2007)
First Secretary of State
 John Prescott, First Secretary of State (1997–2007)
First Lord of the Treasury
 Tony Blair, First Lord of the Treasury (1997–2007)
Minister for the Civil Service
 Tony Blair, Minister for the Civil Service (1997–2007)
Chancellor of the Exchequer
 Gordon Brown, Chancellor of the Exchequer (1997–2007)
Second Lord of the Treasury
 Gordon Brown, Second Lord of the Treasury (1997–2007)
Secretary of State for Foreign and Commonwealth Affairs
 Robin Cook, Secretary of State for Foreign and Commonwealth Affairs (1997–2001)
Secretary of State for the Home Department
 Jack Straw, Secretary of State for the Home Department (1997–2001)
Minister of Agriculture, Fisheries and Food
 Jack Cunningham, Minister of Agriculture, Fisheries and Food (1997–1998)
 Nick Brown, Minister of Agriculture, Fisheries and Food (1998–2001)
Secretary of State for Environment, Transport and the Regions
 Gavin Strang, Secretary of State for Environment, Transport and the Regions (1997–1998)
 John Reid, Secretary of State for Environment, Transport and the Regions (1998–1999)
Secretary of State for Scotland
 Donald Dewar, Secretary of State for Scotland (1997–1999)
Secretary of State for Health
 Frank Dobson, Secretary of State for Health (1997–1999)
Secretary of State for Northern Ireland
 Mo Mowlam, Secretary of State for Northern Ireland (1997–1999)
Secretary of State for Defence
 Lord Robertson of Port Ellen, Secretary of State for Defence (1997–1999)
Secretary of State for Trade and Industry
 Margaret Beckett, Secretary of State for Trade and Industry (1997–1998)
 Peter Mandelson, Secretary of State for Trade and Industry (1998)
 Stephen Byers, Secretary of State for Trade and Industry (1998–2001)
Minister for Women and Equality
 Patricia Hewitt, Minister for Women and Equality (2001–2007)
Secretary of State for Culture, Media and Sport
 Chris Smith, Secretary of State for Culture, Media and Sport (1997–2001)
Secretary of State for Education and Employment
 David Blunkett, Secretary of State for Education and Employment (1997–2001)
Secretary of State for Wales
 Ron Davies, Secretary of State for Wales (1997–1998)
 Alun Michael, Secretary of State for Wales (1998–1999)
Lord Privy Seal
 Lord Richard, Lord Privy Seal (1997–1998)
 Margaret Jay, Baroness Jay of Paddington, Lord Privy Seal (1998–2001)
Leader of the House of Commons
 Ann Taylor, Baroness Taylor of Bolton, Leader of the House of Commons (1997–1998)
 Margaret Beckett, Leader of the House of Commons (1998–2001)
Lord President of the Council
 Ann Taylor, Baroness Taylor of Bolton, Lord President of the Council (1997–1998)
 Margaret Beckett, Lord President of the Council (1998–2001)
Lord Chancellor
 Derry Irvine, Baron Irvine of Lairg, Lord Chancellor (1997–2003)
Secretary of State for International Development
 Clare Short, Secretary of State for International Development (1997–2003)
Secretary of State for Social Security
 Harriet Harman, Secretary of State for Social Security (1997–1998)
 Alistair Darling, Secretary of State for Social Security (1998–2001)
Chancellor of the Duchy of Lancaster
 David G. Clark, Chancellor of the Duchy of Lancaster (1997–1998)
 Jack Cunningham, Chancellor of the Duchy of Lancaster (1998–1999)

Religion
 Archbishop of Canterbury
George Carey, Archbishop of Canterbury (1991–2002)
 Archbishop of York
 David Hope, Archbishop of York (1995–2005)

1998
Leaders
British incumbents